Maureen Anne McTeer (born February 27, 1952) is a Canadian author and lawyer, married to Joe Clark, the 16th Prime Minister of Canada.

Family and education
McTeer was born in Cumberland, Ontario, to John and Bea McTeer. Her father taught her and her older sister, Colleen, to play hockey, resulting in McTeer's childhood dream of playing in the NHL. Her commitment to feminism was born when her father reminded her that girls do not play in the NHL. She switched her focus to her academic and debating talents, which earned her a scholarship to the University of Ottawa. She earned an undergraduate degree in 1973 and a law degree in 1976, both from Ottawa, where she served as features editor of the student newspaper, The Fulcrum, and was a member of the English debate team and the Progressive Conservative Campus Club. McTeer was later awarded an MA in biotechnology, law and ethics from the University of Sheffield, and in 2008 she received an honorary LLD from that institution.

Wife of the prime minister
McTeer worked as a staffer in Clark's office before marrying him in 1973. When Clark became leader of the Progressive Conservative Party of Canada in 1976, McTeer became controversial – feminism still being a relatively new social phenomenon at that time – for keeping her own surname and maintaining her own career. At one official luncheon for Queen Elizabeth, the Queen Mother, where McTeer was seated with the guest of honour, the other women at the table teased McTeer by addressing her always as "Mrs. Clark". The Queen Mother, however, did not, and after McTeer escorted the Queen Mother to her car, the latter said "Don't be bothered by criticism," and, left as parting words: "Good Luck … Ms. McTeer." As of 2022, McTeer remains the only wife of a Canadian prime minister not to assume any part of her husband's surname; although both Laureen Teskey Harper and Sophie Grégoire Trudeau had kept their own birth surnames in their earlier years of marriage, but shifted to using their husband's surname upon assuming the role of prime minister's spouse, in part because of the controversy McTeer experienced.

Career
Maureen is a lawyer, specializing in health policy. She has also been a professor at various universities. In the 1988 federal election, McTeer ran as a Progressive Conservative candidate in Carleton—Gloucester, hoping to get elected alongside her husband. Despite the party's re-election victory, McTeer was not elected in her riding, coming second to the Liberal candidate, Eugène Bellemare. As of 2021, however, she remains the only spouse of a former Canadian Prime Minister to have run for political office herself.

McTeer was also a professor and taught at the Universities of Dalhousie, Calgary and British Columbia in Canada, and was a visiting scholar at the University of California at Berkeley. McTeer was also a distinguished scholar in residence at American University in the Government department and lectured at George Mason University. McTeer is also the author of three books, In my own Name (2011), her autobiography, Parliament: Canada's democracy and how it works (1995), and Residences: Homes of Canada's leaders (1982). McTeer also wrote journals for various academic journals, many on the ethics of health, including euthanasia. Maureen McTeer promoted Frances Itani's novel Deafening in Canada Reads 2006. She promoted its French-language translation, Une coquille de silence, in Le combat des livres 2006.

Honours
In 1982, McTeer and athlete Abby Hoffman were among the organizers of the Esso Women's Nationals championship tournament for women's ice hockey. One of the tournament's trophies, the Maureen McTeer Trophy, is named for her. She was also awarded the DIVA award for Outstanding Contributions to Women's Health and Well-Being, and the Hungarian President's Cross. She is a specialist in medical law, and for a while was a member of the Royal Commission on Reproductive and Genetic Technologies  (1989–1993). She received the Governor General's Award in Commemoration of the Persons Case in 2008. McTeer was also awarded an Honorary Doctorate of Laws from Carleton University in Ottawa in 2010 and an Honorary Doctorate of Civil Law from Acadia University in 2017.

Personal life
McTeer and her husband have one daughter, Catherine, born November 6, 1976. Catherine became a public figure in her own right when her father returned to the leadership of the Progressive Conservatives in 1998. She is now working as a political television broadcaster and has two children.

Bibliography
Residences: Homes of Canada's Leaders (1982)
Tangled Womb: The Politics of Human Reproduction (1992)
Parliament (1995) – translated into French as 
Tough Choices: Living and Dying in the 21st Century (1999) – translated into French as Vivre et mourir au 21e siècle: choix et enjeux
In My Own Name: A Memoir (2003)

Electoral record
Riding of Carleton—Gloucester

See also
 Spouse of the prime minister of Canada

Notes

References

1952 births
Alumni of the University of Sheffield
Canadian feminists
Lawyers in Ontario
Living people
Ontario candidates for Member of Parliament
Politicians from Ottawa
Writers from Ottawa
Spouses of prime ministers of Canada
University of Ottawa alumni
Women in Ontario politics
Governor General's Award in Commemoration of the Persons Case winners
20th-century Canadian women writers
Canadian memoirists
Canadian women lawyers
Canadian women memoirists
20th-century Canadian non-fiction writers
21st-century Canadian non-fiction writers
21st-century Canadian women writers
University of Ottawa Faculty of Law alumni
20th-century Canadian women politicians
Progressive Conservative Party of Canada candidates for the Canadian House of Commons
Candidates in the 1988 Canadian federal election